San Juan County is a county in the southeastern portion of the U.S. state of Utah. As of the 2010 United States Census, the population was 14,746. Its county seat is Monticello, while its most populous city is Blanding. The Utah State Legislature named the county for the San Juan River, itself named by Spanish explorers (in honor of Saint John).

San Juan County borders Arizona, Colorado, and New Mexico at the Four Corners.

History
The Utah Territory authorized creation of San Juan County on February 17, 1880, with territories annexed from Iron, Kane, and Piute counties. There has been no change in its boundaries since its creation. Monticello was founded in 1887, and by 1895 it was large enough to be designated the seat of San Juan County.

Geography

San Juan County lies in the southeastern corner of the state of Utah. Its borders coincide with the borders of the states of Colorado, New Mexico, and Arizona with Utah. The convergence point of these borders, Four Corners Monument, is located at the extreme southeastern corner of the county.

It is the largest county by area in Utah.

The county's western and southern boundaries lie deep within gorges carved by the Colorado and San Juan Rivers. Tributary canyons, cutting through rock layers of the surrounding deserts, have carved the land up with chasms, cliffs, and plateaus. In the center of the county are Cedar Mesa, Comb Wash, Natural Bridges and Hovenweep National Monuments. Canyonlands National Park lies mostly within the county borders. The Eastern side of Glen Canyon National Recreation Area / Lake Powell is also in the county.

The Blue (Abajo) Mountains and the La Sal Mountains exceed  in elevation. Both ranges are covered with lush forests, contrasting the scenery below.

The county's towns lie primarily on a north-south axis along U.S. routes 191 and 163 from La Sal in the north to Monument Valley in the south.

Natural resources

In 2018, the only operating uranium processing plant in the United States was located in the town of Blanding; however, the plant was moved to be on standby in 2019.

San Juan County is home to numerous oil and gas fields, including Squaw Canyon Oil Field, that produce primarily from the Desert Creek and Ismay Formations.

Major highways

Adjacent counties

 Grand County - north
 Mesa County, Colorado - northeast
 Montrose County, Colorado - northeast
 San Miguel County, Colorado - east
 Dolores County, Colorado - east
 Montezuma County, Colorado - east
 San Juan County, New Mexico - southeast
 Apache County, Arizona - south
 Navajo County, Arizona - south
 Coconino County, Arizona - southwest
 Kane County - west
 Garfield County - west
 Wayne County - west
 Emery County - northwest

San Juan County is bordered by more counties than any other county in the United States, at 14.

Protected areas

 Bears Ears National Monument
 Canyonlands National Park (part)
 Dark Canyon Primitive Area
 Glen Canyon National Recreation Area (part)
 Grand Gulch Primitive Area
 Hovenweep National Monument (part)
 Manti-La Sal National Forest (part)
 Natural Bridges National Monument
 Rainbow Bridge National Monument

Demographics

2010 Census
As of the 2010 United States Census, there were 14,746 people and 4,505 households in San Juan County. The racial and ethnic composition of the population was 50.4% Native American, 45.8% white, 0.3% Asian, 0.2% African American and 2.3% reporting two or more races. 4.4% of the population was Hispanic or Latino of any race.

2000 Census
As of the 2000 United States Census, there were 14,413 people, 4,089 households, and 3,234 families in the county. The population density was 1.84/sqmi (0.71/km2). There were 5,449 housing units at an average density of 0.70/km2). The racial makeup of the county was 40.77% White, 0.12% Black or African American, 55.69% Native American, 0.17% Asian, 0.03% Pacific Islander, 1.70% from other races, and 1.51% from two or more races. 3.75% of the population were Hispanic or Latino of any race.

In the 4,089 households, 47.00% had children under 18 living with them, 60.40% were married couples living together, 14.10% had a female householder with no husband present, and 20.90% were non-families. 18.70% of all households were made up of individuals, and 6.70% had someone living alone who was 65 years of age or older. The average household size was 3.46, and the average family size was 4.02.

The county population contained 39.30% under 18, 10.00% from 18 to 24, 25.20% from 25 to 44, 17.10% from 45 to 64, and 8.40% who were 65 years of age or older. The median age was 26 years. For every 100 females, there were 99.50 males. For every 100 females aged 18 and over, there were 94.90 males.

The median income for a household in the county was $28,137, and the median income for a family was $31,673. Males had a median income of $31,497 versus $19,617 for females. The per capita income for the county was $10,229. About 26.90% of families and 31.40% of the population were below the poverty line, including 34.70% of those under age 18 and 35.10% of those aged 65 or over.

As of 2017, San Juan County was the poorest county (per capita) in the state  and one of the poorest in the United States.

Politics and Government
San Juan County has supported Republican presidents since voting for Wendell Willkie in 1940. It supported a Democrat for president in 1896 (William Jennings Bryan), 1916 (Woodrow Wilson), and 1936 (Franklin D. Roosevelt). Though a Republican vote currently secures elections, the area has voted less Republican than the rest of Utah in many national elections. In 2004, for example, George W. Bush won 60.02% in San Juan County versus 71.54% in the state. In 2020, Democrat Joe Biden needed 6.13% more votes to win the county from Donald Trump, who secured 51.2% in the county as opposed to 58.13% in the state as a whole. The county is more competitive at the state level due to its high Native American population, which leans Democratic. Notably, the county voted for the Democratic candidates in the 1988 and 2000 gubernatorial elections, both of which Republican candidates won.

Federally mandated commissioner districts put many Navajo voters in one district. The San Juan County Board of Commissioners has been majority white for many years. In 2016, a Federal District Court decision found voting districts violated the 1965 Voting Rights Act and the U.S. Constitution. Before the 2016 court decision, the county used an at-large voting system to elect commissioners.

In 2018, the first-ever majority-Navajo commission was seated. Two of the three county commissioners, Willie Grayeyes and Kenneth Maryboy, are board members of Utah Diné Bikeyah, which supported the creation of Bears Ears National Monument. In a 2019 special election, Proposition 10, which would have changed the structure of the county government to include five county commissioners, was blocked needing 153 more populous votes. The proposition, spearheaded by Blanding Mayor Joe Lyman, was characterized by opponents as an effort to undermine the Navajo-majority county commission. Mayor Joe Lyman characterized the proposition as a way to restore representation to Blanding, the county's largest city. He states, "I don't like how we arrived at the commissioners we have because it felt like a judicial appointment," and that "the vote is very evenly split."

As of March 2020, efforts were underway to bring municipal water and electrical service to the 29-home Diné (Navajo) community of Westwater, which has existed for decades with neither just outside the city limits of Blanding.

Communities

Cities
 Blanding
 Monticello (county seat)

Towns
 Bluff

Census-designated places

 Aneth
 Halchita
 Halls Crossing
 La Sal
 Mexican Hat
 Montezuma Creek
 Navajo Mountain
 Oljato-Monument Valley
 Spanish Valley
 Tselakai Dezza
 White Mesa

Unincorporated communities
 Eastland
 Ucolo

See also

 List of counties in Utah
 National Register of Historic Places listings in San Juan County, Utah

References

External links

 
 

 
1880 establishments in Utah Territory
Populated places established in 1880